The 1992 Kremlin Cup was a men's tennis tournament played on indoor carpet courts. It was the 3rd edition of the Kremlin Cup, and was part of the International Series of the 1992 ATP Tour. It took place at the Olympic Stadium in Moscow, Commonwealth of Independent States, from 9 November through 15 November 1992. Eighth-seeded Marc Rosset won the singles title.

Finals

Singles

 Marc Rosset defeated  Carl-Uwe Steeb, 6–2, 6–2
 It was Rosset's 2nd singles title of the year and 4th title overall.

Doubles

 Marius Barnard /  John-Laffnie de Jager defeated  David Adams /  Andrei Olhovskiy, 6–4, 3–6, 7–6
 It was Barnard's 1st overall. It was de Jager's 1st overall.

References

External links
 Official website
 ITF tournament edition details

Kremlin Cup
Kremlin Cup
Kremlin Cup
Kremlin Cup
Kremlin Cup